John Cumming Macdona (1836 – 4 May 1907) was a British cleric, barrister, and Conservative MP for Rotherhithe.

Educated at Trinity College, Dublin, he was ordained in the Church of England and was Rector of Cheadle, Cheshire until 1873. He was subsequently a vicar in Sefton. He later gave up the clerical life for a career as a politician and barrister, being called to the bar by the Middle Temple in 1889.

He was elected for Rotherhithe as a Conservative in 1892, held the seat in 1895 and 1900, but lost it to the Liberals in the landslide of 1906.

He was also a breeder of St. Bernard dogs and was President of the Kennel Club.

Sources
Craig, F.W.S. British Parliamentary Election Results 1885-1918
Whitaker's Almanack, 1893 to 1910 editions

Some portraits

Conservative Party (UK) MPs for English constituencies
1836 births
1907 deaths
Politics of the London Borough of Southwark
UK MPs 1892–1895
UK MPs 1895–1900
UK MPs 1900–1906
19th-century English Anglican priests
Alumni of Trinity College Dublin
Dog breeders